Getik may refer to:
Getik, Gegharkunik, Armenia
Getik, Shirak, Armenia
Getikvank, Armenia
Getik River, Armenia